Ameziane is a surname. Notable people with the surname include:

 Ahmed Ameziane, Moroccan politician
 Djamel Ameziane (born 1967), Algerian citizen detained by the U.S. at Guantanamo Bay
 Mohammed Ameziane ( 1859–1912), Moroccan resistance leader